Captain Alexander Victor Drummond (20 October 1888 – 29 April 1937) was an English cricketer.  Drummond's batting and bowling styles are unknown.

Personal life
Born in Westminster, London, he was the son of George James Drummond and Elizabeth Cecile Sophia Norman. He was educated at Harrow School. He later married actress Pauline Chase on 24 October 1914. The couple had three children. Drummond worked full-time as a banker.  He served in the First World War, reaching the rank of captain, before continuing with his banking career after the war. He died in Tunbridge Wells, Kent on 29 April 1937.

Cricket career
Drummond made his first-class debut for the Marylebone Cricket Club against Oxford University in 1911.  He made 7 further first-class appearances for the MCC: 5 before World War I and 2 after, the last of which came against Oxford University in 1921.  In this total of 8 first-class matches, he scored 182 runs at a batting average of 13.00, with a high score of 30.  With the ball he took 3 wickets at a bowling average of 52.33, with best figures of 2/44.  Drummond made a single appearance for Buckinghamshire in the 1921 Minor Counties Championship against Cambridgeshire.

References

External links
Alexander Drummond at ESPNcricinfo
Alexander Drummond at CricketArchive

1888 births
1937 deaths
People educated at Harrow School
People from Westminster
Cricketers from Greater London
English cricketers
Marylebone Cricket Club cricketers
Buckinghamshire cricketers
English bankers
20th-century English businesspeople
British military personnel of World War I
British Army officers
Royal Navy officers
Military personnel from London